Nemopoda is a genus of flies belonging to the family Sepsidae.

Species
Nemopoda ealaensis Vanschuytbroeck, 1962
Nemopoda induans Walker, 1861
Nemopoda mamaevi Ozerov, 1997
Nemopoda nitidula (Fallén, 1820)
Nemopoda pectinulata Loew, 1873

References

Biolib

Sepsidae
Sciomyzoidea genera
Diptera of Europe
Diptera of Asia
Diptera of Africa
Diptera of North America
Diptera of South America
Taxa named by Jean-Baptiste Robineau-Desvoidy